The 1936–37 Football League season was Birmingham Football Club's 41st in the Football League and their 24th in the First Division. They finished in 11th position in the 22-team division. They entered the 1936–37 FA Cup at the third round proper and lost to Stoke City in that round.

Twenty-nine players made at least one appearance in nationally organised competition, and there were thirteen different goalscorers. Goalkeeper Harry Hibbs played in 40 of the 43 matches over the season; among outfield players, full-back Cyril Trigg played in one fewer. Seymour Morris was leading scorer with 16 goals, of which 15 came in the league.

Football League First Division

League table (part)

FA Cup

Appearances and goals

Players with name struck through and marked  left the club during the playing season.

See also
Birmingham City F.C. seasons

References
General
 
 
 Source for match dates and results: 
 Source for lineups, appearances, goalscorers and attendances: Matthews (2010), Complete Record, pp. 314–15.
 Source for kit: "Birmingham City". Historical Football Kits. Retrieved 22 May 2018.

Specific

Birmingham City F.C. seasons
Birmingham